Mohammed Saeed al-Sahhaf (born 30 July 1937) is an Iraqi former diplomat and politician. He served as Minister of Foreign Affairs from 1992 to 2001. He came to worldwide prominence around the 2003 invasion of Iraq, during which he was the Minister of Information under Iraqi President Saddam Hussein, acting as spokesman for the Arab Socialist Ba'ath Party and Saddam's government. He has also been nicknamed Baghdad Bob or Comical Ali (a play on "Chemical Ali") for his notable and colorful television appearances as the Information Minister of Iraq.

Early life and career 
Al-Sahhaf was born in Hilla, near Karbala, to a Shi'ite Arab family. After studying journalism at Baghdad University, he graduated with a master's degree in English literature. He planned to become an English teacher before joining the Arab Socialist Ba'ath Party in 1963. In the early days of Ba'athist governance, he read out regular announcements of recently executed Iraqis on state television.

He served as an ambassador to Sweden, Burma, the United Nations and Italy, before returning to Iraq to serve as Foreign Minister in 1992. The reasons for his removal as Foreign Minister in April 2001 are unclear, but his achievements in the position were often claimed to be less satisfactory than that of his predecessor, Tariq Aziz. At least one report suggests that Uday Hussein, Saddam Hussein's son, was responsible for the removal.

Invasion of Iraq

Nicknames
Al-Sahhaf is known for his daily press briefings in Baghdad during the 2003 invasion of Iraq. His colorful appearances caused him to be nicknamed "Baghdad Bob" (in the style of previous propagandists with geographical aliases—some of them alliterative, such as "Hanoi Hannah" and "Seoul City Sue") by commentators in the United States. He was nicknamed "Comical Ali" by commentators in the United Kingdom; commentators in Italy similarly nicknamed him "Alì il Comico".

Announcements
His pronouncements included claims that American soldiers were committing suicide "by the hundreds" outside the city, and denial that there were any American tanks in Baghdad, when in fact they were only several hundred meters away from the press conference where he was speaking and the combat sounds of nearing American troops could already be heard in the background. On another occasion, he spoke of the disastrous outcomes of previous foreign attempts to invade Iraq, citing an unspecified Western history book and inviting the journalists present to come to his home to read it. His last public appearance as Information Minister was on 8 April 2003, when he said that the Americans "are going to surrender or be burned in their tanks. They will surrender, it is they who will surrender". When asked where he had gotten his information, he replied, "authentic sources—many authentic sources". He pointed out that he "was a professional, doing his job".

He frequently used the word ‘ulūj, an obscure and particularly insulting term for infidels, to describe the American forces in Iraq. This caused some debate in the Arabic-language media about the exact meaning of the word, with most concluding it meant "bloodsucking insect". In an August 2003 interview on Abu Dhabi TV, al-Sahhaf said it was an archaic term attributed to Umar ibn Al-Khattāb.

Al-Sahhaf gained something of a cult following in the West, appearing on T-shirts, cartoons, and in Internet phenomena. In the UK, a DVD documentary was sold about his exploits and televised interviews, called Comical Ali.

Post-war life
On 25 June 2003, British newspaper the Daily Mirror reported that al-Sahhaf had been captured by coalition troops at a roadblock in Baghdad. The report was not confirmed by military authorities and was denied by al-Sahhaf's family through Abu Dhabi TV. The next day, al-Sahhaf recorded an interview for Dubai-based news channel al-Arabiya. He was reportedly paid as much as US$200,000 for the television interview, during which he appeared very withdrawn, in contrast with the bombastic persona he projected during the war. Many of his answers consisted of a simple "yes" or "no". He refused to speculate on the causes of the downfall of the Iraqi government and answered only "history will tell" when asked if video clips purporting to prove that Saddam Hussein was alive were genuine, amid speculation at that time that Hussein had been killed during the war.

His fame quickly evaporated as the war continued into the insurgency phase; from the middle of 2003 onward, he faded from the public spotlight, and was no longer a figure in the war. Al-Sahhaf said that he had surrendered to United States forces, had been interrogated by them and then released. He was not charged for his role in Saddam Hussein's government.

In March 2008, it was reported by The Times that al-Sahhaf was living in the United Arab Emirates.

See also 
 Axis Sally
 British Free Corps
 Hanoi Hannah
 Lord Haw-Haw
 Pyongyang Sally
 Tokyo Rose
 Moussa Ibrahim

References

External links 

|-

1937 births
Living people
Iraqi Muslims
Iraqi propagandists
People from Hillah
Permanent Representatives of Iraq to the United Nations
Ambassadors of Iraq to Sweden
Ambassadors of Iraq to Myanmar
Ambassadors of Iraq to Italy
Arab Socialist Ba'ath Party – Iraq Region politicians
Iraqi Shia Muslims
Iraqi expatriates in the United Arab Emirates
Foreign ministers of Iraq